Hilal Bassam El-Helwe (born 24 November 1994) is a professional footballer who plays as a forward for the Lebanon national team. A versatile forward, he can play both centrally and as a winger on either flank.

After playing for five years in Germany for TSV Havelse, VfL Wolfsburg II, and Hallescher FC, El-Helwe moved to Greek club Apollon Smyrnis in 2018. He returned to Germany in 2019, signing for SV Meppen, with whom he played for two years. El-Helwe then moved to Asia in 2021, playing for Al-Faisaly in Jordan, Ahed in Lebanon, and Penang in Malaysia.

Born in Germany, El-Helwe made his international debut for Lebanon in 2015. He scored a brace against North Korea in the 2019 AFC Asian Cup, helping Lebanon win their first-ever game in the competition.

Early life 
El-Helwe was born to Lebanese parents in Germany; his father had moved to Germany aged seven. El-Helwe has relatives living in Lebanon.

Club career

TSV Havelse
Coming through the youth system, El-Helwe debuted for the senior side of TSV Havelse on 31 August 2013 coming on as a substitute in a 3–2 defeat to Eintracht Braunschweig II. His first goal in the Regionalliga Nord came on 27 October of the same year, scoring the equalizing goal against SV Wilhelmshaven on the 14th minute. He ended his first season at the club with six goals in 26 league games.

In his second season, El-Helwe scored his first domestic brace on 10 October 2014 against Schwarz-Weiß Rehden. He improved on his previous tally scoring 10 goals in 33 appearances for the club, earning him a move to VfL Wolfsburg II the following season.

VfL Wolfsburg II
On 5 September 2015, El-Helwe debuted for VfL Wolfsburg II against his former side TSV Havelse in a 6–1 win, coming on as a substitute on the 65th minute. On 1 November 2015, he scored his first goal for the side against Borussia Hildesheim in a 5–1 away win.

El-Helwe played a total of 22 league games for the side, scoring seven and assisting seven in the process. He helped Wolfsburg win the Regionalliga Nord, and played two promotion play-off games against Jahn Regensburg, losing 2–1 on aggregate.

Hallescher FC

On 22 June 2016, 3. Liga side Hallescher FC announced the acquisition of El-Helwe from VfL Wolfsburg II on a two-year contract. On 6 August 2016, he played his first league match at home against Chemnitzer FC in a 1–1 draw, coming on as a substitute for Sascha Pfeffer on the 78th minute. El-Helwe's first goals for the club came in the form of a brace at the DFB Pokal game against 1. FC Kaiserslautern on 20 August 2016, scoring two goals in four minutes in a 4–3 win.

In the following season, El-Helwe scored his first league goal for the club on 22 July 2017 in the first match of the season, scoring in the 73rd minute against SC Paderborn after coming off the bench in a 4–4 draw. El-Helwe scored a total of four league goals for Halle, all during the 2017–18 season.

Apollon Smyrnis
With his contract expiring, El-Helwe joined Super League Greece side Apollon Smyrnis on a free transfer for the 2018–19 season. El-Helwe's first goal for the club, which came on 15 September 2018, was also Apollon Smyrnis' first of the season, scoring a late consolation goal against PAS Giannina in a 2–1 defeat. On 23 February 2019, El-Helwe scored the equalizer against defending champions AEK, with the match ending 2–1 to the opposing team. Despite finishing last in the league, El-Helwe was Apollon Smyrnis' top scorer in the 2018–19 season with three goals and one assist in 21 appearances.

SV Meppen
On 3 July 2019, 3. Liga side SV Meppen announced the signing of El-Helwe on a free transfer, with his contract valid until 2021. His first goal came on 3 November 2019, scoring against Bayern Munich II in a 5–3 home win. On 12 June 2020, El-Helwe scored against his former club Hallescher FC coming on as a substitute. Despite him equalising the score 1–1, the match ended in a 3–2 loss.

In the last two matchdays of the 2019–20 season, on 1 and 4 July 2020, El-Helwe scored two goals and assisted one. He scored a goal against Preußen Münster in a 3–0 away win, and scored and assisted one against Eintracht Braunschewig, helping his side win 4–3. El-Helwe finished the season with five goals and three assists in 27 games, averaging a contribution every 144 minutes; SV Meppen finished in 7th place of out 20.

El-Helwe scored his first goal of the 2020–21 season on 3 October 2020, in a 2–1 home defeat to Verl. He agreed the termination of his contract with SV Meppen on 25 February 2021.

Al-Faisaly
On 1 March 2021, El-Helwe joined Jordanian Pro League club Al-Faisaly. He made his debut on 4 March, coming on as a 75th-minute substitute in a Jordan FA Shield game against Al-Ramtha which ended in a 2–2 draw. El-Helwe's league debut came on 10 April, in a 2–2 draw against Sahab.

Following his international duty with the Lebanon national team, El-Helwe returned to Jordan on 24 June; however, he refused to attend the training session, and looked to break his contract with the club following financial disagreements.

Ahed
On 16 July 2021, Lebanese Premier League side Ahed announced the signing of El-Helwe, on a six-month contract. Having made his debut on 13 September, as a starter in a 1–0 win against Tripoli, El-Helwe's first goals for Ahed came on 6 November, scoring twice to help his side beat Sporting 2–0. He scored six goals in 11 games in all competitions for Ahed.

Penang
On 17 February 2022, El-Helwe joined Malaysia Super League side Penang. His first goal for Penang came on 9 April, scoring a penalty in a 1–1 draw against Negeri Sembilan. On 14 May, El-Helwe scored a brace against second-tier side Perak in the second round of the Malaysia FA Cup, via a penalty and a free kick, to help Penang win 4–1 and progress to the quarter-finals. He scored another brace in the quarter-finals, against Sri Pahang, to qualify his team to the semi-finals.

El-Helwe terminated his contract with Penang by mutual consent on 20 October, prior to the start of the 2022 Malaysia Cup the following week. He left the club with five goals and two assists in 19 league games.

International career

On 8 October 2015, El-Helwe made his debut for the Lebanon national team, starting in a 2018 FIFA World Cup qualifying 2–0 win against Myanmar. He played as a starter, and was subbed out after 56 minutes. El-Helwe scored his first international goal on 29 March 2016, in Lebanon's home match against Myanmar in the qualifiers, securing a 1–1 draw for his team in the 88th minute.

In December 2018, he was called up for the 2019 AFC Asian Cup squad, and played in all three group stage games. On 17 January 2019, during the last game against North Korea, he scored a volley in the 65th minute thanks to a cross by Mohamad Haidar to put Lebanon in the lead. In the seventh minute of added time, he scored a second volley ending the encounter in a 4–1 win and giving Lebanon their first ever win in the Asian Cup.

On 23 June 2021, El-Helwe scored a volley in a 2021 FIFA Arab Cup qualification match against Djibouti to help Lebanon win 1–0 and qualify for the final tournament.

Style of play 
El-Helwe is a versatile striker who can also play as a winger on both sides. El-Helwe is also a good finisher in the box. SV Meppen's sporting director, Heiner Beckmann, described El-Helwe as "physically strong, quick and very versatile in attack" upon signing for the club.

Career statistics

Club

International

Scores and results list Lebanon's goal tally first, score column indicates score after each El-Helwe goal.

Honours
VfL Wolfsburg II
 Regionalliga Nord: 2015–16

Ahed
 Lebanese Premier League: 2021–22
 Lebanese Elite Cup runner-up: 2021

See also
 List of Lebanon international footballers
 List of Lebanon international footballers born outside Lebanon

References

External links

 Profile at Apollon Smyrnis
 
 

Living people
1994 births
Footballers from Hanover
Association football forwards
Association football wingers
Lebanese footballers
German footballers
German people of Lebanese descent
TSV Havelse players
VfL Wolfsburg II players
Hallescher FC players
Apollon Smyrnis F.C. players
SV Meppen players
Al-Faisaly SC players
Al Ahed FC players
Penang F.C. players
Regionalliga players
3. Liga players
Super League Greece players
Jordanian Pro League players
Lebanese Premier League players
Malaysia Super League players
Lebanon international footballers
2019 AFC Asian Cup players
Lebanese expatriate footballers
Lebanese expatriate sportspeople in Greece
Lebanese expatriate sportspeople in Jordan
Lebanese expatriate sportspeople in Malaysia
German expatriate footballers
German expatriate sportspeople in Greece
German expatriate sportspeople in Jordan
German expatriate sportspeople in Malaysia
Expatriate footballers in Greece
Expatriate footballers in Jordan
Expatriate footballers in Malaysia